Overdetermined may refer to:
 Overdetermined systems in various branches of mathematics
 Overdetermination in various fields of psychology or analytical thought